Christian Florus Balduin Dahl (October 6, 1834 – June 3, 1891) was a Danish composer and conductor.  He spent a portion of his career with Den Kongelige Livgarde.  He was the son of a musician at Tivoli Gardens.

References

Male composers
Danish conductors (music)
Male conductors (music)
1834 births
1891 deaths
19th-century Danish composers
19th-century conductors (music)